Günther Altenburg (5 June 1894 in Königsberg – 23 October 1984 in Bonn) was a German diplomat.

His first diplomatic assignments took him to postings at Rome, Vienna and Bucharest, and he remained involved with southeastern Europe throughout his career. In 1934, he was serving in Vienna during the failed July Putsch, and probably involved in its preparation. Thereafter he was recalled to Berlin, where he worked in the section dealing with Austria and Czechoslovakia.

He joined the Nazi Party in 1935, and was given a position in the secretariat of Foreign Minister Joachim von Ribbentrop. After the invasion of Yugoslavia in April 1941, he was initially slated to become plenipotentiary for Serbia, but on 28 April 1941 he was named Reich plenipotentiary for Greece. As the highest-ranking German civil official in occupied Greece, he functioned as the overseer of the Greek puppet government along with his Italian counterpart Pellegrino Ghigi, and was directly involved in the deportation of the Jewish population of Thessaloniki in spring 1943. He was removed from his post on 3 November 1943, after the Italian capitulation and the complete occupation of Greece by the Germans, which led to a complete restructuring of the German administration under the new Military Governor of Greece, Alexander Löhr.

After the war, he testified at the Nuremberg trials, and served as the secretary general of the Deutsche Gruppe der Internationalen Handelskammer ("German Group of the International Chamber of Commerce") industrial lobby.

1894 births
1984 deaths
German diplomats
German occupation of Greece during World War II
Holocaust perpetrators in Greece
Nazi Party members